Felix David William Eriksson (born 21 May 2004) is a Swedish footballer who plays for IFK Göteborg as a defender.

References

External links 
 

2004 births
Living people
Swedish footballers
IFK Göteborg players
Association football defenders